Latin America is represented under the Global Geoparks Network by the geoparks of the Latin American Geoparks Network (Red GEOLAC). As of 2019, it includes 7 UNESCO Global Geoparks and further projects are in progress seeking UNESCO status or that of national geopark in South America, Central America and the Caribbean

UNESCO Global Geoparks

Aspiring and planned geoparks 
According to the register of GeoLAC, the following geopark projects are in an aspiring phase (documentation close to submission to UNESCO or already submitted), or under planning, in a hatching phase.

The Latin American Geoparks Network

History 
Geoparks incitatives in Latin America have been the subject of geoscience conferences since 2001 and the first member, Araripe, Brazil was admitted to the Global Geoparks Network in 2005.  The 1st Latin American and the Caribbean Conference of Geoparks in 2010 issued the "Declaration of Araripe", stating that“the conservation, valorisation and education of the Geological Heritage – the memory of the Earth–, the Natural Heritage and Cultural Heritage, tangible and intangible, are subject to sustainable development and correspond to the need and concerns of the people in the continental region of Latin America and the Caribbean" and

"It shall allow the development of instruments for regional and global cooperation through exchange of experiences and management practices among Geoparks ..."The "1st Symposium of Geoparks" in Arequipa, Peru issued the "Declaration of Arequipa", confirming the reaffirming the Declaration of Araripe and"advancing with the operational guidelines of the Latin American and Caribbean UNESCO Global Geoparks... with the UNESCO Regional Office for Latin America and the Caribbean ... assuming the (transitory) responsibility of moving forward with the creation of the rules of operation and other communication objectives in conjunction with the signatory partners."The official declaration of the foundation of the UNESCO Global Geoparks Network for Latin America and the Caribbean (GeoLAC) was issued in 2017 May, during the "4th Latin American and Caribbean Symposium on Geoparks", by four founding members (Araripe, Grutas del Palacio, Comarca Minera and Mixteca Alta UNESCO Global Geoparks).

The network was enlarged with 3 new members in 2019 (Colca y Volcanes de Andagua, Imbabura, Kütralküra) and aspiring and planned geoparks are also related to the regional geopark network.

Recognition of Latin America's geodiversity under different international frameworks

World Heritage sites 
Twelve sites are represented currently on the World Heritage list under criterion VIII, as outstanding representatives of Earth's history:

 Los Glaciares National Park (Argentina),
 Ischigualasto / Talampaya Natural Parks (Argentina),
 Talamanca Range-La Amistad Reserves / La Amistad National Park  (Costa Rica, Panama),
 Desembarco del Granma National Park (Cuba),
 Morne Trois Pitons National Park (Dominica),
 Galápagos Islands (Ecuador),
 Sangay National Park (Ecuador),
 Río Plátano Biosphere Reserve (Honduras)
 El Pinacate and Gran Desierto de Altar Biosphere Reserve (Mexico)
 Huascarán National Park (Peru)
 Pitons Management Area (Saint Lucia)
 Canaima National Park (Venezuela)

Further sites are inscribed under criterion VII of superlative natural phenomena and aesthetic importance. Some of them, which have a special geoheritage importance are:

 Iguazu National Park (Argentina, Brazil),
 Los Alerces National Park (Argentina),
 Belize Barrier Reef Reserve System (Belize),
 Atlantic Forest South-East Reserves (Brazil),
 Pantanal Conservation Area (Brazil), 
 Brazilian Atlantic Islands: Fernando de Noronha and Atol das Rocas Reserves (Brazil),
 Islands and Protected Areas of the Gulf of California (Mexico),
 Archipiélago de Revillagigedo (Mexico),
 Historic Sanctuary of Machu Picchu (Peru)

Notes

References

External links 
 Latin American and the Caribbean Geoparks Network (GeoLAC) (accessed 22 January 2020)

Lists of UNESCO Global Geoparks
Geopark networks
Geoparks in Central America
Geoparks in South America